A local election was held in the Mexican state of  Tabasco on Sunday, 15 October 2006. Voters went to the polls to elect, on the local level:

A new Governor of Tabasco to serve for a six-year term.
17 municipal presidents (mayors) to serve for a three-year term.
Local deputies to serve for a three-year term in the Congress of Tabasco.

Gubernatorial Election
Eight political parties participate in the 2006 Tabasco state election; two of them (the PRD and PT) joined forces.

NOTE: Although CD participated in the election the party decided to have no candidate for Governor of Tabasco while the PASDC decided, at the end of the campaign, to support the PRD-PT candidate.

Tabasco
Election
Tabasco elections